Edwin Sidney Lanier (July 19, 1901 – March 5, 1983) was an American Democratic politician, who served as mayor of Chapel Hill, North Carolina, as a member of the North Carolina Senate, and as North Carolina Commissioner of Insurance.

References

External links
 

1901 births
1983 deaths
Mayors of Chapel Hill, North Carolina
University of North Carolina at Chapel Hill alumni
20th-century American politicians
Democratic Party North Carolina state senators
State insurance commissioners of the United States